Richardson K. Dilworth (August 29, 1898 – January 23, 1974) was an American Democratic Party politician who served as the 91st mayor of Philadelphia from 1956 to 1962. He twice ran as the Democratic nominee for governor of Pennsylvania, in 1950 and in 1962. He is to date the last White Anglo-Saxon Protestant mayor of Philadelphia.

Education and early career
He was born in Pittsburgh to Joseph Richardson Dilworth and Annie Hunter (Wood) Dilworth. He enlisted in the Marine Corps in World War I and was commissioned as an officer in World War II. In 1938, he joined the law firm of Dilworth Paxson. In 1921 he graduated from Yale University, where he was a member of Scroll and Key and Delta Kappa Epsilon, and lettered for the varsity football team. In 1926 he graduated from Yale Law School, afterwards becoming an attorney in Philadelphia. On August 6, 1935, he married Ann Elizabeth Kaufman. They had a daughter, Deborah, and a son, Richardson Jr.

Political career
Dilworth had grown up as a Republican, but became a Democrat out of frustration with the city's longstanding Republican machine.  Along with Joe Clark and others, he was at the forefront of a post-World War II reform movement in Philadelphia that led to the adoption of a modern city charter that consolidated city and county offices and introduced civil service examinations on a broad scale to replace much of the existing patronage system.

Dilworth initially ran for mayor in 1947 against incumbent Republican Barney Samuel. Samuel was seeking his second full term in office, after assuming office following the death of Robert Lamberton in 1941. Dilworth was ultimately defeated by over 90,000 votes; however, the election marked the last time, to date, that a Republican was elected mayor of Philadelphia. In 1949, Dilworth was elected city treasurer, while Clark was elected city controller. Dilworth ran for governor in the 1950 election, losing a close race to John Fine. In 1951, he was elected Philadelphia District Attorney, while Clark was elected mayor. Clark and Dilworth's inaugurations ended a 67-year period of uninterrupted Republican control of the city (and instituted a period of uninterrupted Democratic control which has persisted past 2022). In 1955, Dilworth was elected mayor, defeating Thacher Longstreth.

During their tenures as mayor, Clark and Dilworth introduced a variety of reforms and innovations. Among these was extensive high-rise public housing which would, a generation later, be condemned by many as a breeding ground for poverty and crime. However, they also greatly strengthened the city planning function of Philadelphia city government. Both retained Edmund Bacon as executive director of the Philadelphia City Planning Commission, and the Clark-Dilworth era is recognized as a high-water mark for planning, during which the decline of Center City Philadelphia as a commercial and residential center was reversed and priority was given (particularly during Dilworth's administration) to saving the city's historic and irreplaceable Society Hill district. Dilworth resigned as mayor on February 12, 1962, to launch a second bid for governor.

Despite President John F. Kennedy's work on his behalf, Dilworth lost the fall general election by a half million votes to progressive Republican Congressman Bill Scranton, in what scholars considered "one of the bitterest [campaigns] in Pennsylvania history." Scranton had run for governor (with fellow progressive Raymond P. Shafer for lieutenant governor) after a deeply divisive Republican primary involving Philadelphia Republican boss Billy Meehan's candidate, Judge Robert E. Woodside; and five other candidates. Republicans also carried both houses of the state legislature in that landslide election.

In 1960 and 1961, Dilworth served as president of the United States Conference of Mayors. A 1993 survey of historians, political scientists and urban experts conducted by Melvin G. Holli of the University of Illinois at Chicago ranked Dilworth as the eleventh-best American big-city mayor to have served between the years 1820 and 1993.

Personal
With his wife, Ann Dilworth, he was a passenger on the SS Andrea Doria, an ocean liner that collided with the MS Stockholm near Nantucket, Massachusetts, on July 25, 1956, and subsequently sank.  They were saved, and Dilworth was on board the last lifeboat that was picked up by the SS Île de France.

After being mayor
Following his tenure as mayor, Dilworth served as partner in the Philadelphia-based law firm of Dilworth Paxson LLP, which bears his name. He also served as president of the Philadelphia School Board, and in 1971 was appointed one of two bankruptcy trustees (along with Andrew Lewis) for the Reading Company, a railroad company headquartered in Philadelphia.

Dilworth Park, adjacent to Philadelphia City Hall, is named in his honor.

An abstract "rising phoenix" made by sculptor Emlen Etting in 1982 is a memorial to the Mayor; it was moved from its original location at North end of Dilworth Plaza to 38th Parallel Place in 2013.

References

External links

Philadelphia City Archives' finding aid for Dilworth's mayoral correspondence and files
The Richardson Dilworth papers, covering a large part of his career as mayor, are available for research use at the Historical Society of Pennsylvania.

1898 births
1974 deaths
United States Marine Corps personnel of World War I
United States Marine Corps personnel of World War II
District Attorneys of Philadelphia
Mayors of Philadelphia
Pennsylvania Democrats
Yale University alumni
20th-century American politicians
Shipwreck survivors
Presidents of the United States Conference of Mayors
United States Marine Corps officers
Philadelphia City Controllers